Goldkartz (sometimes stylised GoldKartz)  is a Malaysian Indian music duo consisting of two Sikh brothers - Manjit Singh Gill and Sukhjit Singh Gill. They make Punjabi-inspired dance music. They have been called "the first serious attempt by a Southeast Asian bhangra recording act to cross over to foreign markets".

History
Goldkartz's first album, Loaded, was released in 2008 and had some success in Malaysia. In 2010, they began working on their second album 24 Karaatz. Rosmah Mansor, the wife of Malaysian Prime Minister Najib Razak, helped in its release. 24 Karaatz was released in 2011 in Malaysia and in the USA, the UK, Europe, Canada and India.

Reception
They have received critical acclaim for their music. Goldkartz's first album Loaded was the first bhangra album to be recorded and made completely in Malaysia and received that distinction in the Malaysian Book of Records.

Discography
 Loaded (2008)
 24 Karaatz (2011)

References

External links
 Official website

Malaysian world music groups
Bhangra (music) musical groups
Indian-Malaysian culture
Desi musical groups
Performers of Sikh music
Musical groups established in 2008